Sorting nexin-13 is a protein that in humans is encoded by the SNX13 gene.

Function 

This gene encodes a PHOX domain- and RGS domain-containing protein that belongs to the sorting nexin (SNX) family and the regulator of G protein signaling (RGS) family. The PHOX domain is a phosphoinositide binding domain, and the SNX family members are involved in intracellular trafficking. The RGS family members are regulatory molecules that act as GTPase activating proteins for G alpha subunits of heterotrimeric G proteins. The RGS domain of this protein interacts with G alpha(s), accelerates its GTP hydrolysis, and attenuates G alpha(s)-mediated signaling. Overexpression of this protein delays lysosomal degradation of the epidermal growth factor receptor. Because of its bifunctional role, this protein may link heterotrimeric G protein signaling and vesicular trafficking.

References

Further reading